Nikolay Mitrofanovich Krylov (– May 11, 1955) was a Russian and Soviet mathematician known for works on interpolation, non-linear mechanics, and numerical methods for solving equations of mathematical physics.

Biography
Nikolay Krylov graduated from St. Petersburg State Mining Institute in 1902. In the period from 1912 until 1917, he held the Professor position in this institute. In 1917, he went to the Crimea to become Professor at the Crimea University. He worked there until 1922 and then moved to Kyiv to become chairman of the mathematical physics department at the Ukrainian Academy of Sciences.

Nikolay Krylov was a member of the Société mathématique de France and the American Mathematical Society.

Research
Nikolay Krylov developed new methods for analysis of equations of mathematical physics, which can be used not only for proving the existence of solutions but also for their construction. Since 1932, he worked together with his student Nikolay Bogolyubov on mathematical problems of non-linear mechanics. In this period, they invented certain asymptotic methods for integration of non-linear differential equations, studied dynamical systems, and made significant contributions to the foundations of non-linear mechanics. They proved the first theorems on existence of invariant measures known as Krylov–Bogolyubov theorems, introduced the Krylov–Bogoliubov averaging method and, together with Yurii Mitropolskiy, developed the Krylov–Bogoliubov–Mitropolskiy asymptotic method for approximate solving equations of non-linear mechanics.

Doctoral students
Nikolay Bogolyubov

Publications
Nikolay Krylov published over 200 papers on analysis and mathematical physics and two monographs:
Nicolas Kryloff (1931): Les Méthodes de Solution Approchée des Problèmes de la Physique Mathématique. Paris: Gauthier-Villars [in French].
N. M. Krylov, N. N. Bogoliubov (1947): Introduction to Nonlinear Mechanics. Princeton: Princeton University Press. .

See also
Describing function
Krylov–Bogolyubov theorem
Krylov–Bogoliubov averaging method
Krylov–Bogolyubov–Mitropolskiy asymptotic method

References 

1879 births
1955 deaths
20th-century Russian mathematicians
20th-century Russian physicists
20th-century Ukrainian mathematicians
20th-century Ukrainian physicists
Mathematicians from Saint Petersburg
Full Members of the USSR Academy of Sciences
Saint Petersburg Mining University alumni
Academic staff of the Taras Shevchenko National University of Kyiv
Academic staff of Tavrida National V.I. Vernadsky University
Recipients of the Order of Lenin
Recipients of the Order of the Red Banner of Labour
Control theorists
Mathematicians from the Russian Empire
Physicists from the Russian Empire
Russian mathematicians
Russian physicists
Soviet mathematicians
Soviet physicists
Ukrainian physicists
Ukrainian people of Russian descent
Burials at Novodevichy Cemetery